Claire Eccles (born October 25, 1997) is a Canadian baseball player. She is a left-handed pitcher who throws three pitches, including a knuckleball. She has been a member of the women's national baseball team of Canada, and has competed in the 2014 and 2016 Women's Baseball World Cups as well as the 2015 Pan American Games. In 2017, she joined the Victoria HarbourCats of the West Coast League and became the first woman to play in that league. She was also a member of the softball team at the University of British Columbia.

Baseball

Canadian National Team
Eccles made her international debut at 16 in the 2014 Women's Baseball World Cup. She appeared in one game and pitched four scoreless innings as the Canadian team finished in fourth place. In 2015, she competed in the women's baseball tournament in the 2015 Pan American Games. It was the debut appearance of women's baseball in the Pan American games, and the Canadian team won the silver medal. The team would again take silver at the 2016 Women's Baseball World Cup, with Eccles going 1–0 with a 0.00 ERA over 8 2/3 innings and recording five strikeouts.

West Coast League
On May 16, 2017, the Victoria HarbourCats of the West Coast League, a collegiate summer baseball league, announced the signing of Eccles.  Following the announcement, R. A. Dickey, a knuckleballer pitching in the major leagues, posted a message of congratulations on Twitter.

On June 8, Eccles made her HarbourCats debut against the Wenatchee AppleSox, becoming the first woman to play in the WCL.  She entered in relief and pitched two innings, giving up one hit, one walk, and two runs. On June 18, Eccles made her first start and earned her first win for Victoria, as the HarbourCats won 11–2 in a non-league game against the Kitsap BlueJackets, a former WCL team. She appeared in eight games for the HarbourCats in 2017.

The team announced on its website that she will be returning for its 2018 season.

Pitching style
Eccles throws three pitches, a two-seam fastball, curveball and knuckleball. Although she throws a knuckleball, she uses her pitches evenly and does not consider herself a "knuckleball pitcher".

Softball
Eccles was a member of the softball team at the University of British Columbia. Unlike baseball, she did not pitch, but played the outfield. In her sophomore season, she hit .293. In her junior season, she hit .358 and was named a second-team all star and gold glove award winner for the Cascade Collegiate Conference.

References

1997 births
Canadian female baseball players
Baseball pitchers
Living people
Baseball players at the 2015 Pan American Games
Pan American Games silver medalists for Canada
Pan American Games medalists in baseball
Victoria HarbourCats players
UBC Thunderbirds players
Canadian softball players
Medalists at the 2015 Pan American Games